The World Short Track Speed Skating Team Championships were a professional team short track speed skating event and held once a year in a different country.

The top eight countries from the ISU Short Track Speed Skating World Cup qualified automatically. Four skaters from each country raced in the 500 meter, and 1000 meters, two skaters from each country race in the 3000 meters and there was a team effort in the 3000 meters relay, for women, and the 5000 meters relay for men. Eight countries are divided into two brackets, and do races. Countries with a first placed skater got 5 points, and 3 points, 2 points, 1 points respectively, the sum of each skater for the races determined the rank. The first placed countries qualified for Final A, last placed country qualified for Final B. Repechage were held for the remaining two qualified countries for Final A.

The Championships was first held in 1991 and was discontinued until further notice by ISU after the 2011 season.

Past results

Men's

Women's

Medals (1991-2011)

References

External links
World Short Track
International Skating Union

Recurring sporting events established in 1991
2011 disestablishments in Poland
Recurring sporting events disestablished in 2011